Sybil Judith Chaplin , known as Judith Chaplin (née Schofield; 19 August 193919 February 1993), was a Conservative Party politician in the United Kingdom.

Career
Chaplin was elected councillor for Norfolk County Council 1975, following her husband into the role. There she became chairman of the education committee. She took on a role in 1986 with Institute of Directors, becoming head of policy for the group. in 1988 she became special advisor to Nigel Lawson, then Chancellor of the Exchequer, and remained in the role when John Major took over the following year. When Major became  Prime Minister, she acted as his Private Secretary and political assistant.

She was elected to Parliament for Newbury at the 1992 election. In the following June, she was appointed OBE, and she was considered likely to become chancellor of the exchequer herself in the future. However, her death less than a year later meant that she did not achieve the role.

Personal life
Sybil Judith Schofield born in Harpenden, Hertfordshire on 19 August 1939. Her father, Theodore Thomas Schofield was a dentist and her mother was Sybil Elsie, née Saunders. She was educated at Wycombe Abbey and before studying economics at Girton College, Cambridge. She would also go on to gain a post-graduate economics degree from University of East Anglia.

She married Robert Walpole, 10th Baron Walpole in 1962 with whom she had two sons and two daughters, including Alice Walpole, Ambassador of the United Kingdom to Luxembourg. However, their marriage was ultimately dissolved in 1979, and she married Luke Keohane in 1984.

Chaplin died of a pulmonary embolism on 19 February 1993.

See also
 List of United Kingdom MPs with the shortest service
 1993 Newbury by-election

References

1939 births
1993 deaths
20th-century British women politicians
Alumni of Girton College, Cambridge
Alumni of the University of East Anglia
Conservative Party (UK) MPs for English constituencies
Conservative Party (UK) councillors
Deaths from pulmonary embolism
Female members of the Parliament of the United Kingdom for English constituencies
Members of Norfolk County Council
Members of the Parliament of the United Kingdom for constituencies in Berkshire
Officers of the Order of the British Empire
People educated at Wycombe Abbey
People from Harpenden
UK MPs 1992–1997
Judith
20th-century English women
20th-century English people
Women councillors in England